The Book of Fours is an original novel based on the American television series Buffy the Vampire Slayer.

Plot summary

Taking place during Buffy'''s third season, Faith and Buffy are the current Slayers. When mayhem caused by tidal waves and burning forests begin to erupt in Sunnydale as well as vicious attackers appearing with ceremonial axes, the gang knows that something is up. A woman named Cecile Lafitte has sent her Servants to kill the Slayers with special axes, Faith being the Slayer of Fire and Buffy being the Slayer of Air. Each Servant has a special axe made to destroy the Slayer of that particular element. Should Faith and Buffy both be killed then it's believed that the line of Slayers would die out forever. Cecile wants to bring forth the Gatherer, and the only way to do so is to have the Slayers killed, which would feed the demon enough power to bring him forth into the world. Meanwhile, Willow ends up in the hospital with major brain trauma while Giles figures they need answers from the Watcher of the Slayer that preceded Buffy, India Cohen.

During the final confrontation with the Gatherer, Willow and Cordelia briefly serve as hosts for India (the Slayer of Water) and Kendra (the Slayer of Earth) respectively. Eventually with the help of the spirits of the former Slayers, Lucy Hanover and the spirits that live in the woods where the battle takes place, the group defeats the Gatherer and destroys it by each absorbing parts of its soul.  Buffy also decapitates Cecile with the axes.

Self-cultural reference
At one point Willow is talking about her dream with Matthew Broderick, Buffy says 'You pick the strangest guys to dream about, Will' . . . 'How come it's never someone current? Y'know like Seth Green?' Seth Green plays Oz, Willow's boyfriend, on the television show.

Continuity

Supposed to be set late in Buffy season 3.
Shares continuity with many Buffy books including the Gatekeeper trilogy, Immortal, and Spike and Dru: Pretty Maids All in a Row.
India Cohen was the slayer that preceded Buffy. She is seen on the front cover of the book, the third from left. The character also appears in Tales of the Slayer'', Volume III, in the story The Code of the Samurai.

Canonical issues

Buffy novels such as this one are not usually considered by fans as canonical. However, unlike fan fiction, overviews summarizing their story, written early in the writing process, were 'approved' by both Fox and Joss Whedon (or his office), and the books were therefore later published as officially Buffy merchandise.

External links

Reviews
Litefoot1969.bravepages.com - Review of this book by Litefoot
Teen-books.com - Reviews of this book
Nika-summers.com - Review of this book by Nika Summers
Shadowcat.name - Review of this book

2001 American novels
Books based on Buffy the Vampire Slayer
Novels by Nancy Holder